Giovani Daniel Casillas Chávez (born 4 January 1994) is a Mexican professional footballer who last played as a midfielder for Real Zamora. Casillas won the U17 World Cup in Mexico 2011.

Club career 
Growing up in the Club Deportivo Guadalajara youth system, Giovani Casillas made his first team debut during the 2011 World Football Challenge in a friendly against FC Barcelona, where he scored the third goal in a 4–1 win. He made his professional debut at the age of 17 on August 6, 2011, in a 0-0 Pumas-Chivas, entering in the 82nd minute for Jesús Sánchez. However, a knee injury sidelined him for the rest of the season. In 2012, he rejoined the first team, and made six appearances, including two as a starter. He also appeared in four Copa Libertadores 2012 matches.

On February 21, 2013, sister club Chivas USA announced they had acquired Giovani Casillas and teammates Mario de Luna and Edgar Mejia on loan from CD Guadalajara.  He scored his first professional goal against FC Dallas on March 10, 2013, in a 3–1 win.  The goal came in stoppage time in the 93rd minute on an assist from fellow Guadalajara loanee Edgar Mejia.

International career 
Casillas was a member of the Mexico U17 side that won the 2011 FIFA U-17 World Cup.

Honours
Guadalajara
Copa MX: Apertura 2015

Mexico U17
FIFA U-17 World Cup: 2011

References

External links

1994 births
Living people
Footballers from Guadalajara, Jalisco
Association football midfielders
Mexican footballers
Mexico youth international footballers
C.D. Guadalajara footballers
Chivas USA players
Chiapas F.C. footballers
Coras de Nayarit F.C. footballers
Tampico Madero F.C. footballers
La Piedad footballers
Mexican expatriate footballers
Expatriate soccer players in the United States
Liga MX players
Major League Soccer players